Livsforsikringsselskapet Hygea was a life insurance company based in Bergen, Norway.

It was founded in 1883. It was for many years a part of the Vesta Group, and shared leadership with the Vesta Group's flagship Vesta; together they were branded as Vesta-Hygea. After the Vesta Group was bought by Skandia in 1989, the new owners decided to merge Hygea with Norsk Kollektiv Pensjonskasse in 1990 to create Vital Forsikring.

References

Insurance companies of Norway
Companies based in Bergen
Financial services companies established in 1883
1883 establishments in Norway
Companies disestablished in 1990